Adeoye "Ade" Olubunmi Mafe (born 12 November 1966) is a retired male English sprinter who competed in the 200 metres and 400 metres. At the age of 17, he represented Great Britain at the 1984 Olympic Games, reaching the 200 metres final. Also at 200 meters, he is a three-time World Indoor medallist and the 1989 European Indoor champion. After retiring from athletics, he went on to work as a fitness coach for several football clubs, including Chelsea, Millwall, Milton Keynes Dons, West Bromwich Albion and Watford. On 8 Jan 2019 Ade appeared on The Chase.

Athletics career
Mafe was born in Isleworth, London. At the 200 metres, he won the gold medal at the 1989 European Indoor Championships in 20.92; silver at the 1985 IAAF World Indoor Games in 20.96 and a silver at the 1989 World Indoor Championships in 20.87. He represented England and won a bronze medal in the 200 metres event, at the 1990 Commonwealth Games in Auckland, New Zealand, in 20.26 (w). He reached the final of 200 metres at the 1984 Olympic Games, where he finished eighth.

Mafe is a member of the British team which set the world indoor record for the rarely contested 4 x 200 metres relay on 3 March 1991 in Glasgow. Mafe and his teammates Darren Braithwaite, Linford Christie and John Regis ran a time of 1:22.11, which has yet to be bettered.

Mafe is also a member of the team which holds the British outdoor record for the 4 x 200 metres relay. Mafe and Marcus Adam, Linford Christie and John Regis set a time of 1:22.99 in Birmingham on 23 June 1989.

Football career
In 1996 Mafe was signed by Ruud Gullit and Chelsea Football Club to coach the players fitness and training, the Chelsea players fitness was improved under Mafe so much that they won the FA Cup and went on to achieve great things.

In July 2008, Roberto Di Matteo was appointed as the new manager of the Milton Keynes Dons after Paul Ince left to become Blackburn Rovers boss, and Mafe was appointed fitness coach at MK Dons to work alongside Di Matteo and his assistant Eddie Newton. Mafe followed Di Matteo to West Bromwich Albion in June 2009.

On 6 February 2011, Mafe left West Bromwich Albion when Roberto Di Matteo was relieved of his duties at the club. Mafe joined the coaching staff at Watford F.C. in October 2012, linking up with Gianfranco Zola whom he knew from his time at Chelsea. He left Watford in July 2013.

Achievements

References

External links

1966 births
Living people
20th-century English people
Athletes from London
Athletes (track and field) at the 1984 Summer Olympics
Athletes (track and field) at the 1990 Commonwealth Games
Commonwealth Games bronze medallists for England
Commonwealth Games medallists in athletics
English male sprinters
Olympic athletes of Great Britain
Chelsea F.C. non-playing staff
Milton Keynes Dons F.C. non-playing staff
West Bromwich Albion F.C. non-playing staff
Watford F.C. non-playing staff
World Athletics indoor record holders (relay)
World Athletics Indoor Championships medalists
World Athletics Championships winners
Medallists at the 1990 Commonwealth Games